The 2012 Danish Cup Final was a football match that decided the winner of the 2011–12 Danish Cup. It was played on 17 May 2012 at 18:00 CEST.

Road to the Final
As decided by the results of last season's Superliga, Horsens entered the Cup in the second round, Copenhagen in the third round.

Match

References

Danish Cup Finals
Cup Final
Danish Cup Final 2012
Sports competitions in Copenhagen
May 2012 sports events in Europe
2012 in Copenhagen